Donika Bashota (born 12 April 1995) is a Swedish–Kosovar tennis player.

Bashota has a career high WTA singles ranking of 1059, achieved on 11 November 2013. She also has a career high WTA doubles ranking of 622, achieved on 12 August 2013. Bashota has won two ITF doubles titles.

Bashota represents Kosovo in the Fed Cup.

ITF finals (2–0)

Doubles (2–0)

References

External links
 
 
 

1995 births
Living people
Swedish female tennis players
Kosovan female tennis players
Swedish people of Kosovan descent
TCU Horned Frogs women's tennis players